KACY may refer to:

 the ICAO code for Atlantic City International Airport
 KACY, a radio station (102.5 FM) licensed to Arkansas City, Kansas, United States
 KACY (TV), a former television station licensed to serve Festus, Missouri, United States
 KVQT-LD, a low-power television station (channel 21) licensed to serve Houston, Texas, United, which held the call sign KACY-LP from 1996 to 2000
 KFXZ (AM), a radio station (1520 AM) licensed to serve Lafayette, Louisiana, United States, which held the call sign KACY from 1990 to 1996
 KTRP (AM), a radio station (1450 AM) licensed to Notus, Idaho, United States, which held the call sign KACY from 1984 to 1990
 KVEN, a radio station (1520 AM) licensed to Port Hueneme, California, United States, which held the call sign KACY from 1958 to 1984
 KCAQ, a radio station (104.7 FM) licensed to serve Oxnard, California, which held the call sign KACY-FM from 1978 to 1983